Askanysh (Asqanış) is a rural locality (a village) in Ivano-Kazansky Selsoviet, Iglinsky District, Bashkortostan, Russia. The population was 46 as of 2010. There are 7 streets.

Geography 
Askanysh is located 42 km south of Iglino (the district's administrative centre) by road. Rodniki is the nearest rural locality.

References 

Rural localities in Iglinsky District